Thomas Muster defeated MaliVai Washington in the final, 7–6(8–6), 2–6, 6–3, 6–4 to win the singles tennis title at the October edition of the 1995 Eurocard Open.

Seeds
All sixteen seeds receive a bye into the second round.

Draw

Finals

Section 1

Section 2

Section 3

Section 4

External links
 ATP Singles draw

Singles